The Central American Atlantic moist forests ecoregion (WWF ID: NT0111) covers the lowland coastal forests of Honduras, southeast Guatemala, and the eastern forests of Nicaragua. Half of the ecoregion is closed-canopy tropical broadleaf evergreen forest, with tree heights reaching 50 meters.

Location and description 
The ecoregion stretches for 700 km from the valley of Lake Izabal in southeastern Guatemala, across the northern coast of Honduras (in a 50 km wide strip), and down across most of the eastern half of Nicaragua.

Climate 
The climate of the ecoregion is Tropical monsoon climate (Köppen climate classification (Am)).  This climate is characterized by relatively even temperatures throughout the year (all months being greater than  average temperature), and a pronounced dry season.  The driest month has less than 60 mm of precipitation, but more than (100-(average/25) mm.  This climate is mid-way between a tropical rainforest and a tropical savanna.  Average precipitation in the ecoregion is 2,333 mm/year.

Flora and fauna 
Half of the ecoregion is closed-canopy broadleaf evergreen rain forest, but with 30% of the territory converted agriculture. The remainder is open canopy evergreen forest or herbaceous wetland.  From 1990 to 2000, the ecoregion was experiencing deforestation at a rate of just under 1% per year.  The ecoregion contains a number of large undisturbed fragments, which is important for larger species of animals.  (The largest mammals require an estimated 100 km2 fragment to sustain viable populations).

Protected areas 
30.2% of the ecoregion is officially protected. These protected areas include:
 Agalta National Park
 Azul Meámbar National Park
 Blanca Jeannette Kawas National Park (Punta Sal)
 Bosawás Biosphere Reserve
 Capiro-Calentura National Park
 Cerro Azul National Park
 Cerro Saslaya National Park
 Chocón Machacas
 Cuevas de Silvino National Park
 Cusuco National Park
 Montaña de Botaderos Carlos Escaleras Mejía National Park
 Montaña de Yoro National Park
 Nombre de Dios National Park
 Omoa National Park
 Patuca National Park
 Pico Bonito National Park
 Pico Píjol National Park
 Punta Izopo National Park
 Port Royal National Park
 Río Dulce National Park
 Río Plátano Biosphere Reserve
 Santa Bárbara National Park
 Tawahka Asagni Biosphere Reserve
 Temash-Sarstoon National Park

References 

 
Ecoregions of Guatemala
Ecoregions of Honduras
Ecoregions of Nicaragua
Neotropical tropical and subtropical moist broadleaf forests